The Joneses is a 2009 American comedy-drama film written and directed by Derrick Borte, in his directorial debut. It stars Demi Moore, David Duchovny, Amber Heard,  and Ben Hollingsworth. It premiered at the 2009 Toronto International Film Festival on September 13, 2009. Roadside Attractions later purchased the United States theatrical distribution rights. It had a limited release on April 16, 2010 and was released on DVD & Blu-ray On August 10, 2010.
It received a theatrical release in Mexico on August 20, 2010.

Plot
Kate, Steve, Mick, and Jenn Jones move into an upscale suburb under the pretense of being a typical family relocating because of the changing nature of Kate's and Steve's careers. In reality, Kate is the leader of a team of stealth marketers, professional salespeople who disguise product placement as a daily routine. Their clothing, accessories, furniture, and even food are carefully planned and stocked by various companies to create visibility in a desirable consumer market. While Kate's team is highly effective, Steve is new to the team, Jenn is a closet nymphomaniac with a penchant for hitting on her fake fathers, and a 30-day review is fast approaching.

The team quickly ingratiates itself into the community, slowly shifting from displaying products to recommending them. Soon, local stores and businesses are stocking products based on the Joneses' trend-setting styles. However, at the end of the 30-day review, Steve discovers that he has the lowest sales numbers of the team, and Kate's job is endangered unless he can get his numbers up before the next review in 60 days. Eventually, Steve begins to find a sales tactic that works by playing on the fears of his neighbors and sympathizing with their dull, repetitive, unfulfilled careers. As someone who is frustrated with his job and disconnected from his fake "family", Steve turned to their products to keep himself entertained. When he recognizes this same pattern in his neighbors, his sales begin to steadily increase as he starts pitching products as the solution for suburban boredom and generating product "buzz" through unwitting ropers.

The team's dynamics become more complicated when Kate applies herself to the technique as well. Realizing that they can boost sales by perfecting their fake family dynamic to sell the image of a lifestyle, the lines between acting and reality start to break down. Things also get more complicated when Mick finds himself growing closer to an unpopular girl at the high school, Naomi, in whom he can confide, while Jenn's flirtation with Alex Bayner, one of the men in the neighborhood, raises the suspicions of the neighbors. The team's cover is almost blown at several times: once when an old acquaintance of Steve's recognizes him at a restaurant, again when Jenn's indiscretions nearly expose her real age, and after a party where Mick markets alcohol to minors.

Eventually, each member of the team finds that the constant pretense slowly erodes their individual desires. Jenn's dreams of running away with a rich, older man come to a close when she realizes that she was being used by Alex. Mick has a crisis of conscience when Naomi gets into a car accident after drinking too much of a wine cooler that the family was marketing to teens. Worse, when he makes a pass at Naomi's brother, he gets punched in return, giving him a black eye.

After amassing nearly record-breaking numbers, Steve is offered the chance to join an "icon" unit alone. He refuses, knowing that this is Kate's dream and because he believes that the "family" can do it together. When Steve's closest friend in the community, Larry, reveals that he's going to lose his house because he's overextended his credit, Steve tries again to see if Kate wants something more than a pretend marriage. She rebuffs him, and the next day Steve discovers to his horror that Larry has committed suicide over the debts. Grief-stricken, Steve confesses to the community about the real nature of his job. With their covers blown, the rest of the Joneses leave quickly and are reassigned to a new home. Steve refuses the offer to join an icon cell and tracks the family down to their new location. There, he reunites with Kate and tries one last time to convince her to leave. Though hesitant she follows him out of town and agrees to meet his family in Arizona.

Cast
 David Duchovny as Steve Jones
 Demi Moore as Kate Jones
 Amber Heard as Jenn Jones
 Ben Hollingsworth as Mick Jones
 Gary Cole as Larry Symonds
 Glenne Headly as Summer Symonds
 Lauren Hutton as KC (the Joneses' boss)
 Chris Williams as Billy (salon owner)
 Christine Evangelista as Naomi Madsen
 Jayson Warner Smith as Maitre d'
 Robert Pralgo as Alex Bayner
 Tiffany Morgan as Melanie Bayner
 Wilbur Fitzgerald as Golfer

Reception
On Rotten Tomatoes the film has an approval rating of 62% based on 131 reviews, with an average rating of 6.2/10. The critical consensus states: "It doesn't pursue its subversive premise as far as it should, but The Joneses benefits from its timely satire of consumer culture as well as a pair of strong performances from David Duchovny and Demi Moore." On Metacritic the film has a score of 55% based on reviews from 30 critics, indicating "mixed or average reviews".

See also
 Keeping up with the Joneses

References

External links
 
 

2009 comedy-drama films
2009 films
Films shot in Georgia (U.S. state)
2000s English-language films
Roadside Attractions films
2009 directorial debut films
American comedy-drama films
2000s American films